Eve Systems GmbH (branded as Eve and formerly called Elgato Systems GmbH) is a German smart home and home automation producer founded on June 27, 2018. The brand originally existed as a line of smart home products manufactured by Elgato Systems, a company best known for a line of video-recording and gaming products. The Elgato brand and gaming division of the company was sold to Corsair in June 2018, while the main company was renamed to Eve Systems retaining the Eve brand of smart home devices.

History

EyeTV 

Elgato Systems introduced the EyeTV brand in November 2002. The first device was a small USB-powered device that contained a cable tuner and hardware encoder in order to convert television video into an MPEG-1 format for watching on a computer.  It also had coaxial and RCA plugs to connect it with a VCR or camcorder. A 2002 article in Macworld said it was the "first step" in bridging computers and television, but at this point still had "some kinks". The next device was the EyeTV 200 released in 2004. The EyeTV 200 allowed for digital remote control and converted programing into MPEG-2. The same year, Elgato released the Eye Home media server. By 2005, several other EyeTV products had been introduced, such as the EyeTV for DTT, the EyeTV EZ and the EyeTV Wonder.

In February 2016, Elgato sold EyeTV to Geniatech Europe GmbH, a wholly owned subsidiary of Shenzhen Geniatech Inc., Ltd.

Elgato Gaming 

In 2012, the company introduced Game Capture HD, which connects to gaming consoles to record gameplay. It was created in response to gamers that were hacking EyeTV products for gameplay recording. In October 2014 Elgato released a new version called HD 60. It recorded in 60 frames per second and 1080p high definition video (compared to the previous Game Capture HD's 1080p30 or 720p60), whereas typical low-end video game recording devices capture in 720p and 30 frames per second.

In June 2018, the Elgato Gaming line of products and the Elgato brand were sold to Corsair, while the main company was renamed to Eve Systems retaining the Eve brand of smart home devices.

Eve 
The Eve brand was introduced in 2014 when Elgato introduced a home monitoring system called Eve, which provides alerts to users regarding things like air pressure, temperature and water use. Elgato also developed light bulbs that can respond to programming on a mobile device and respond to commands over Bluetooth. In May 2018, Elgato introduced Eve Aqua, a smart water controller.

In late 2014, Elgato introduced the Smart Power battery backup for mobile devices. It communicates with the user's Bluetooth-enabled device to provide notifications and calendar reminders when it needs to be charged.

Eve Systems 
When the Elgato Gaming brand was split from the company and sold to Corsair in June 2018, the company renamed itself from Elgato Systems to Eve Systems, retaining its Eve smart home brand.

Products

Smart key 

Eve manufactures and markets a smart-key system. The system comes with a small 10-gram device that is placed on a key ring, in a purse, inside a car, or somewhere else. Then it communicates with an Elgato app on an iOS device. If it is set up for keys, the app will alert the user when they are 10 meters away from their keys, indicating that they may have forgotten them. It takes advantage of the "Smart Bluetooth" Apple implemented in iOS 7. A review in TheNextWeb said it was "money well spent" and worked "exactly as described", but that the beeping of the device could be louder and users will still need to supplement it with the Find my Phone app. A review in Macworld gave it 4 out of 5 stars.

Smart home 
In September 2014, Elgato Systems announced a home monitoring system called Eve, which monitors a home's air pressure, water usage, temperature, air quality and other factors.  It also introduced smart light bulbs, which communicate with iOS devices through Bluetooth and allow users to adjust home lighting from their mobile device. They are HomeKit-Enabled.

As of July 2018, the current series of smart home products includes:

 Eve Flare – portable smart LED lamp
 Eve Button – smart home remote
 Eve Degree – Wi-Fi-enabled thermostat
 Eve Door & Window – door and window sensor
 Eve Light Switch – smart wall switch
 Eve Motion – motion sensor
 Eve Room – indoor air quality, temperature, and humidity sensor
 Eve Smoke – smoke detector
 Eve Thermo – radiator valve
 Eve Aqua – sprinkler controller

Smart power 
In late 2014, Elgato introduced the Smart Power battery backup for mobile devices. It communicates with the user's bluetooth-enabled device to provide notifications and calendar reminders when it needs to be charged.

In 2016, they released Eve Energy, a smart plug which provides power meter features through its mobile app.

References

External links 

 

Home automation companies
Technology companies established in 2018
Internet of things companies
Information technology companies of Germany
Manufacturing companies based in Munich